Ryan Reser (born April 16, 1980 in Denver, Colorado) is a male judoka from the United States, who won the gold medal in the men's lightweight division (– 73 kg) at the 2007 Pan American Games, defeating Brazil's Leandro Guilheiro in the final. He represented his native country at the 2008 Summer Olympics.

References
 sports-reference

1980 births
Living people
American male judoka
Judoka at the 2008 Summer Olympics
Judoka at the 2007 Pan American Games
Olympic judoka of the United States
Sportspeople from Denver
Pan American Games gold medalists for the United States
Pan American Games medalists in judo
Medalists at the 2007 Pan American Games